Hatebrand was a Benedictine abbot. He is famed for having revived the Benedictine order, in the area of Frisia.

References

German Roman Catholic saints
12th-century Christian saints
1198 deaths
Dutch Benedictines
Year of birth unknown
People from Delfzijl